This is a chronological list of world cruiserweight boxing champions, as recognized by four of the better-known sanctioning organizations:

Championship recognition 
 The World Boxing Association (WBA), founded in 1921 as the National Boxing Association (NBA),
 The World Boxing Council (WBC), founded in 1963,
 The International Boxing Federation (IBF), founded in 1983,
 The World Boxing Organization (WBO), founded in 1988,

Footnotes 
1 Championship recognition withdrawn due to champion's failure/refusal to defend title against mandatory or designated challenger.
2 Relinquished title.

Cruiserweight champions who won belts in other divisions 
Braxton, Jack, Michalczewski, Hill, Erdei, Adamek, Shumenov and Tiozzo all were light-heavyweight champions.
Holyfield, Haye, and Usyk are the only former cruiserweight champions to win the heavyweight title with Holyfield earning recognition as undisputed champions in both divisions.
Toney won titles at middleweight and super middleweight. He also defeated John Ruiz in an attempt to win the heavyweight title but failed a post-fight drug test and the result was changed to a No Decision.
 Jack won titles at super middleweight.

See also 
List of Australian cruiserweight boxing champions
List of British cruiserweight boxing champions
List of New Zealand cruiserweight boxing champions
 List of British world boxing champions

References

External links 

Cruiserweight Champions

World boxing champions by weight class